José Manuel Sierra Méndez  (born 21 May 1978) is a Spanish handball player who plays for Bidasoa Irún.

Sporting achievements

Clubs
Domestic Titles
 Liga ASOBAL: 1996–1997, 1997–1998, 1998–1999, 1999–2000 (FC Barcelona Handbol); 2003–2004 (BM Ciudad Real).
 Copa del Rey de Balonmano: 1996–1997, 1997–1998, 1999–2000 (FC Barcelona Handbol); 2004–05, 2005–06 (BM Valladolid).
 Supercopa ASOBAL:  1996–1997, 1997–199, 1999–2000 (FC Barcelona Handbol).
 Copas ASOBAL: 1999–2000 (F.C. Barcelona); 2002–2003 (BM Valladolid); 2003–2004 (BM Ciudad Real).
 Hungarian Champion: 2017–2018.

International Titles
 EHF Champions League: 1996–1997, 1997–1998, 1998–1999, 1999–2000 (FC Barcelona Handbol).
 EHF Cup Winners' Cup: 2008-2009 (BM Valladolid).
 EHF Men's Champions Trophy: 1997, 1998, 1999 (FC Barcelona Handbol).
 Pyrenean handball league: 1997, 1998, 1999 (FC Barcelona Handbol).

National team
  Gold Medal at the 2005 Mediterranean Games
  Gold Medal at the 2013 World Men's Handball Championship.

References

1978 births
Living people
Spanish male handball players
Liga ASOBAL players
FC Barcelona Handbol players
BM Ciudad Real players
BM Valladolid players
Mediterranean Games gold medalists for Spain
Competitors at the 2005 Mediterranean Games
Mediterranean Games medalists in handball
Sportspeople from the Province of Huelva
Spanish expatriate sportspeople in France
Expatriate handball players
Spanish expatriate sportspeople in Hungary